Dr. Marek Obrtel is a Czech Republic Army ex-officer, who served in the Afghanistan War. He is best known for returning the medal he received during his posting in Afghanistan War for NATO operations in protest against the U.S. policy on Russia, calling the North Atlantic alliance a "criminal organization" with "atrocious interests". He served in 11th Field Hospital of Army of Czech Republic.

He also made a statement to a Belgrade daily commenting on NATO's involvement in the Kosovo War in 1999. "Genocide against Serbs took place in Kosovo, and it was instigated by the West. For this reason, I am filled with sadness, bitterness and disappointment as I was part of the NATO machinery. I also witnessed how drug lords became respectable officials of the so-called state of Kosovo, and how mass murderers became heroes".

References

1966 births
Living people
Czech Republic and NATO
Czech military doctors
Czech military personnel of the War in Afghanistan (2001–2021)